Claudia Coari Mamani (born 1967) is a Quechua politician in Peru. She was a member of the Congress of the Republic of Peru between 2011 and 2014, representing the Peruvian Nationalist Party (Partido Nacional Peruano), but was no longer a congresswoman by March 2018.

In 2018 she was part of a delegation of indigenous women leaders from 10 countries in South America who traveled to Chile for the launch of a Food and Agriculture Organization campaign to eradicate hunger. She stressed the importance of family farms for food security, saying that in her area women took on most of this work.

She was congratulated by Bolivian president Evo Morales for wearing the indigenous pollera colourful woollen skirt in Congress, with pride in her heritage.

References

1967 births
Living people
Peruvian Nationalist Party politicians
Members of the Congress of the Republic of Peru
21st-century Peruvian women politicians
21st-century Peruvian politicians
Quechua politicians
Women members of the Congress of the Republic of Peru